This is a list of Korean desserts. Korean cuisine known today has evolved through centuries of social and political change. Originating from ancient agricultural and nomadic traditions in southern Manchuria and the Korean peninsula, Korean cuisine has evolved through a complex interaction of the natural environment and different cultural trends.

Korean desserts

Hangwa

Hangwa is a general term for Korean traditional confectionery. Common ingredients in hangwa are grain flour, honey, yeot, sugar, fruit or edible root.
 Dasik 
 Gangjeong 
 Gwapyeon 
 Jeonggwa 
 Maejakgwa 
 Mandugwa 
 Suksilgwa 
 Yakgwa 
 Yeot 
 Yeot-gangjeong 
 Yumilgwa

Tteok

Tteok is a class of Korean rice cakes made with glutinous rice flour (also known as sweet rice or chapssal), by steaming.
 Baek-seolgi
 Gaepi-tteok
 Bupyeon
 Danja
 Hwajeon
 Injeolmi
 Jeolpyeon
 Jeungpyeon
 Mujigae tteok
 Sirutteok
 Songpyeon
 Tteokbokki
 Tteokguk
 Yaksik

See also

Korean desserts
 Korean cuisine – sweets
 List of Korean dishes – desserts

Related topics
 Cuisine
 Korean baked goods
 Korean snacks (category)
 List of desserts
 List of Korean beverages
 List of North Korean dishes

References

External links
 

 
Korean
Desserts